The 1994–95 Edmonton Oilers season was the Oilers' 16th season in the NHL, and they were coming off a tough 1993–94 season, when they finished the year 25–45–14, failing to qualify for the playoffs for the 2nd straight season.

The 1994–95 season was nearly cancelled due to a lockout, however, on January 11, 1995, an agreement was made between the NHL owners and the players, and a shortened 48 game schedule was used for the season.

The Oilers named George Burnett as head coach of the club, as Burnett coached the Oilers AHL affiliate, the Cape Breton Oilers for the previous 2 seasons, including leading the team to the Calder Cup in 1993.  Edmonton got off to a solid start, and 27 games into the season, the Oilers sat in 2nd place in the Pacific Division with 26 points, only 3 behind the division leading Calgary Flames. The Oilers then went on a 10-game winless streak, costing Burnett his job, as former Oilers goaltender Ron Low replaced him. It was too little too late, as Edmonton would finish the season 17–27–4, earning 38 points, and missed the playoffs for the 3rd straight season.

Offensively, Doug Weight led the team with 40 points, while David Oliver was the Oilers goal scoring leader with 16. Jason Arnott had another solid season, scoring 15 goals and earning 37 points.  Defenseman Igor Kravchuk led the blueline with 18 points in 36 games, while Bryan Marchment had a club high 184 penalty minutes.

In goal, Bill Ranford played in 40 games, winning 15 of them, with a 3.62 GAA and 2 shutouts along the way. However, the Oilers allowed a league-high 183 goals and Oilers goaltenders combined for a league-low .877 save percentage.

The Oilers had the most power-play opportunities during the regular season, with 259. They also allowed the most power-play goals, with 52.

Season standings

Schedule and results

Season stats

Scoring leaders

Goaltending

Awards and records

Awards

Milestones

Transactions

Trades

Free agents

Draft picks
Edmonton's draft picks at the 1994 NHL Entry Draft

References
National Hockey League Guide & Record Book 2007

Edmonton Oilers season, 1994-95
Edmon
Edmonton Oilers seasons